Rhinodia is a genus of moths in the family Geometridae first described by Achille Guenée in 1857. Both species are known from Australia.

Species
Rhinodia rostraria Guenée, 1857
Rhinodia undiferaria (Walker, 1866)

References

Caberini